San Anemos (English: 'like wind') is the sixth studio album by Greek singer Antonis Remos.

Its tracks are all titled in Greek:

"" ('Stay a bit in line')
"" ('Like wind')
"" ('I don't want you to love me')
"" ('Don't leave')
"" ('You should')
"" ('As long as I live')
"" ('Where can you be')
" (Per Altre Cento Vite Ancora)" ('For 100 lives still')
"" ('Don't ask')
"" ('What are you waiting for')
"" ('At the body')
"" ('Alive')
"" ('Smile')
"" ('The angels')
"" ('Even if I have you or don't have you')
"" ('Sorry')

References

2005 albums
Antonis Remos albums